Victor Vaughn Bolden Jr. (born April 4, 1995) is an American football wide receiver who is a free agent. He played college football at Oregon State, and signed with the San Francisco 49ers as an undrafted free agent in 2017.

Professional career

San Francisco 49ers
Bolden signed with the San Francisco 49ers as an undrafted free agent on May 4, 2017.

In Week 2, against the Seattle Seahawks, Bolden had three kickoff returns for 71 total yards in his NFL debut. On December 13, 2017, Bolden was placed on injured reserve with an ankle injury.

On June 1, 2018, Bolden was suspended the first four games of the 2018 season for violating the league's policy on performance-enhancing substances.

On October 30, 2018, Bolden was waived by the 49ers and re-signed to the practice squad.

Buffalo Bills
On December 18, 2018, Bolden was signed by the Buffalo Bills off the 49ers practice squad. He was waived on August 31, 2019.

Detroit Lions
On December 3, 2019, Bolden was signed to the Detroit Lions practice squad. On December 30, 2019, Bolden was signed to a reserve/future contract.

On September 5, 2020, Bolden was waived by the Lions and signed to the practice squad the next day. He was released on September 9, and re-signed to the practice squad on October 13. He signed a reserve/future contract on January 5, 2021.

On August 31, 2021, Bolden was waived.

Birmingham Stallions
Bolden was selected with the first pick of the 13th round of the 2022 USFL Draft by the Birmingham Stallions.

On June 16, 2022, Bolden was named as a Wide Receiver and Special Team All-USFL Team.

On July 3, 2022, he received the MVP award of the USFL championship game for his efforts during the Stallions victory over the Philadelphia Stars.

Arizona Cardinals
On July 22, 2022, Bolden signed with the Arizona Cardinals. He was waived on August 30, 2022 and signed to the practice squad the next day. He was placed on the practice squad/injured list on September 14, 2022. He was released on September 20.

Denver Broncos
On November 15, 2022, Bolden was signed to the Denver Broncos practice squad. He signed a reserve/future contract on January 9, 2023. He was waived on March 14, 2023.

Notes

References

External links
Detroit Lions bio
San Francisco 49ers bio
Oregon State Beavers bio

1995 births
Living people
American football return specialists
American football wide receivers
Arizona Cardinals players
Buffalo Bills players
Detroit Lions players
Oregon State Beavers football players
Players of American football from California
San Francisco 49ers players
Sportspeople from San Bernardino County, California
Birmingham Stallions (2022) players
Denver Broncos players